Börje is an old Swedish male name. It is a cognate of Birger; Börje is the form that has developed naturally according to the sound change laws of Swedish, whilst Birger is a literary form that has been common since the nineteenth century, when archaic forms of names became fashionable.

Etymology
The etymology of Börje is uncertain. Probably it is a short form of names beginning with Berg‐. Less likely it means ”helper”, from the verb bärga. It has also been suggested that it is derived from the name element ‑ger (spear).

Sound changes
Börje developed from Old Swedish Birghir which was pronounced with a voiced velar fricative [ɣ]: [birɣir]. The voiced velar fricative was spelled ⟨gh⟩ i Old Swedish and changed to /j/ after /r/ in modern Svenska.

Börje is an ija‑stem. Ija‑stems ended in ‑ir i Old Swedish, which regularly developed into a word final ‑e in modern Swedish. This explains why Börje has accent 2 today: since the synkope at the transition from Proto-Norse to Norse the name has been disyllabic, which leads to a word being pronounced with the grave accent in modern Swedish. Hence, the vowel in the second syllable of old Swedish Birghir or Birgher was no svarabhakti vowel like the ‑e‑ in modern Swedish words such as the a‑stem dager, which at one stage was monosyllabic (dagr) and therefore has accent 1.

The first vowel ‑i‑ of Birghir between a b and an r changed into an ‑y‑ and then into an ‑ö‑. The vowel was ‑i‑ labialised by the influence of the initial /b/.

The form Birger
The form Birger has been revived from the old language within the last 200 years. This "revived" form has accent 1, like an a‑stem with a nominative suffix consisting of the svarabhakti‐vowel ‑e‑ plus ‑r. Swedish names revived during romanticism commonly take a historically unjustified pronunciation.

Popularity
Börje was very common as a given name in 1930–49. Today it is almost never given as a first name that is used to address the person. In 2017 approximately 7 500 persons had the name as their first name or name of address.

Name day in Sweden: 9 June).

People with the given name Börje 
Börje Ahlstedt (born 1939), Swedish actor
Börje Ekedahl (1928–2006), Swedish bobsledder
Börje Ekholm (born 1963), Swedish business executive, CEO of Ericsson
Börje Fredriksson (1937–1968), Swedish jazz tenor saxophonist
Börje Haraldsson (born 1957), Swedish physician and researcher
Börje Hörnlund (born 1935), Swedish politician
Börje Jansson (born 1952), Swedish motorcycle road racer
Börje Leander (1918–2003), Swedish footballer
Börje Salming (1951–2022), Swedish ice hockey player
Börje Vestlund (1960–2017), Swedish social democratic politician
Börje-Bengt Hedblom, Swedish bobsledder
Lars-Börje Eriksson (born 1966), Swedish Alpine skier
Quorthon (Thomas Börje Forsberg) (1966–2004), Swedish songwriter and musician

References

Swedish masculine given names

da:Børge
no:Børge
nn:Børge